Mark Anthony Gaius Versallion is a British politician, businessman, and officer in the Royal Naval Reserve.  He was the Conservative prospective parliamentary candidate for Stretford and Urmston from 2007 to 2009 and from 2009 to 2011 was Chairman of the Foreign Affairs Forum of the Conservative Party.  Since 2011 he has been a member of Central Bedfordshire unitary authority.

Early life
Born in Cornwall, England, Versallion established his first business in 1988, a music promotions and equipment company, and was educated at the University of Westminster in business and economics.  He then gained a master's degree in politics at the University of Reading, tutored by John Cottingham, and at Reading was elected chairman of post-graduates.  After being admitted to the Royal Institute of International Affairs and the Carlton Club, he gained a joint doctorate at the Universities of Oxford and Reading.

Career
During the 1990s Versallion worked in the House of Commons as an aide to Cabinet Office Minister, Robert Hughes MP, and in 1996 was elected chairman of the Young Conservatives. In 1997 he joined BAE Systems, moving on from there to Capgemini. After working for U. S. Senator Rod Grams in the 2000 U.S. elections, Versallion returned home and founded the London marketing agency VML. He was its managing director in London and Minneapolis from 2001-11.  In 2011, on his election to Central Bedfordshire Council, he gave up operational control of his company and became its chairman, making more time for politics. Versallion was a non-executive director of the North West London NHS Hospitals Trust from 2008-13 and from 2013-20 was a non-executive director of the Luton and Dunstable University Hospital.

Naval career
In 1996 Versallion was recruited by the Royal Navy Reserve.  Before passing out from Britannia Royal Naval College he served aboard the destroyer HMS Gloucester. After Dartmouth he served aboard the frigate HMS Richmond before appointment to classified roles.  In 2009 he was part of Operation Pearl, a counter-piracy mission off the Horn of Africa.  In 2010 he was awarded the VR medal.  He is a graduate of the Joint Services Command and Staff College and of the NATO School at Oberammergau, Germany and held the rank of Lieutenant.  He left the Royal Navy in 2015.

Local politics
In 1996 Versallion was selected for the Harrow London Borough Council seat of Harrow on the Hill, becoming a school governor in 1997 and deputy chairman of his constituency association in 1998.  However in the local elections of 1998 he lost by five votes, in a cliff-hanger election with three recounts. The result decided the overall control of the Council. He was encouraged to fight on by his friend Nicholas Bethell.

In 2002 he was elected as a London Borough Councillor for Harrow on the Hill, and at the same time the Conservatives narrowly gained control there.  In nine years at Harrow he held roles in Performance and Finance, Education, and Children and Young People, and Chief Whip when there was a Tory majority of one.  He served on the Deputy Lieutenants' Committee 2007-11, and due to his naval experience was the Council's representative on the Reserve Forces and Cadets Association.  Outside council, Versallion was Chairman of Harrow Hill Trust Community Relations, a Director of Harrow Fields Gardens Estate Company, and a board member of the Harrow Heritage Trust.

In 2011, Versallion was elected to Central Bedfordshire Council for the ward of Heath and Reach.  After his nomination as Bedfordshire's Portfolio Holder for Education in 2011, to avoid conflict of interest, Versallion himself ceded his place as a Councillor in London in order to avoid double responsibilities. He was appointed cabinet portfolio holder for Children's Services and Schools and resigned from Harrow Council.

He also resigned from his day job as director of a marketing company to focus on his Cabinet role in Central Bedfordshire. Versallion became Military Covenant Champion for Central Bedfordshire in 2011.  According to The Times, he quickly changed the policy of the Council to enable rapid school reorganisation. In a BBC One TV news interview on 17 April 2012 he defended his decision to close a state-run PRU school and create a new free school in its place, controversially with Council assets. In 2012-13 Versallion converted ten schools' age ranges, bringing to an end the decades-long arguments over the three tier education system in Bedfordshire. In 2014 he closed a further three schools.<ref>"Dunstable middle schools closure consultation to begin". (5 February 2014). BBC News. Retrieved 12 May 2014.</ref> He was the subject of a government film on these changes.  In 2015 national media reported that Versallion was planning to create a new grammar school in Bedfordshire.

In 2016 he became Chairman of the Overview and Scrutiny Committee on Children's Services and since 2019 has been Chairman of the scrutiny committee on Social Care, Health and Housing.

National politics
Versallion worked in the House of Commons in the 1990s as an aide to Cabinet Office Minister, Robert Hughes MP and various ad hoc political roles from 1996-2001, including with The House magazine and Robert Key MP.  Versallion worked for U. S. Senator Rod Grams in the 2000 U.S. elections and worked for Michael Portillo MP in the 2001 Conservative Party leadership election.

In 2007 Versallion was selected as the Conservative parliamentary candidate for Stretford and Urmston, a position he resigned from in October 2009. In December 2009, it was reported that Versallion had become chairman of the Foreign Affairs Forum of the UK Conservative Party."Foreign Affairs Forum of the Conservative Party", Retrieved 31 Jan 2010  His first overseas engagement was in Macedonia in January 2010, representing the Conservative Party, with Lord Foulkes representing Labour, in meetings with the parliament and Trajko Veljanovski on democratisation for accession to the EU and NATO. His two-year term of office ended late 2011.

Publications
Versallion is the author of:A Conquest of Thoughts (London: Powell Press, 1995)Furore Poeticus'' (London: Powell Press, 1996)

References

External links

Foreign Affairs Forum of the Conservative Party
Central Bedfordshire Council
Mark Versallion web site

Living people
Alumni of the University of Reading
Alumni of the University of Westminster
Graduates of Britannia Royal Naval College
Graduates of the Joint Services Command and Staff College
Councillors in the London Borough of Harrow
Councillors in Bedfordshire
Year of birth missing (living people)
Politicians from Cornwall
Royal Naval Reserve personnel